Min-ki is a Korean male given name.

People with this name include:
Jo Min-ki (1965–2018), South Korean actor
Kim Min-ki (born 1951), South Korean singer, composer, and playwright
Lee Min-ki (born 1985), South Korean actor and singer

See also
List of Korean given names

Korean masculine given names